Lake Washington County Park is a  park in Le Sueur County in the U.S. state of Minnesota. The park is located on the northwest shore of Lake Washington, about 10 miles northeast of Mankato. The lake is named after President George Washington. The park was established in 1971 by the Le Sueur County Government. There are hiking trails, 31-site campground, and a Community Building among other public amenities.

External links 
Le Sueur County Parks Department

References

Parks in Minnesota
Protected areas of Le Sueur County, Minnesota
Buildings and structures in Le Sueur County, Minnesota
Tourist attractions in Le Sueur County, Minnesota